Gorgas may refer to:

Gorgas Hospital, a hospital in Panama named after William C. Gorgas
USS General W. C. Gorgas (ID-1365), a United States Navy troop transport in commission in 1919
USAT General W. C. Gorgas (1902), a United States Army Transport in service from 1941 to 1945
Gorgas, Alabama

People with the surname
Josiah Gorgas (1818–1883), Confederate General and later President of the University of Alabama
Amelia Gayle Gorgas (1826–1913), librarian and postmistress of the University of Alabama; wife of Josiah
William C. Gorgas (1854–1920), United States Army officer and physician known for fighting tropical disease; son of Josiah and Amelia

See also
 Gorgias (disambiguation)